Design on a Dime is a decorating television series that aired on HGTV from 2003-2013. In this long-running series, a design team demonstrates how problem areas can be revitalized on a budget of only $1,000. The show was based in Chicago, Ill. and featured a rotation of design teams and hosts. Later episodes featured designer Casey Noble (a season five Design Star contestant) using innovative solutions to the toughest makeover scenarios, and with a bigger budget of $2,500. There were a few variations, including episodes highlighting a $3,000 wedding, Christmas, a special "Etsy" episode and more.

Hosts

 Casey Noble (2011-2013): Noble began her design career as a computer graphic artist in Washington, D.C., before moving to California to study interior design at The Fashion Institute of Design & Merchandising. In 2009, Noble founded her own design firm with two colleagues. She competed in season five of HGTV's Design Star, finishing in the top three. 
 Kahi Lee: Lee started her HGTV career hosting the series Freestyle (2005-2007). She joined Design on a Dime in 2007. She also works as an interior designer in Los Angeles.
 Sam Kivett
 Frank Fontana: Fontana won The Great Domestic Showdown, a reality television show on ABC in 2004. He joined Design on a Dime in 2007 and worked primarily with Kelly Edwards and Ali Azhar.
 Lee Snijders: Lee was the second host and lead designer on Design on a Dime. In 1990, Snijders created Lee Snijders Designs, which encompassed his love of interior and furniture design. He worked for five years with Walt Disney Imagineering. In 2001, he became the designer spokesperson for House to Home and  appeared on numerous television design shows until becoming the host and lead designer for HGTV's Design on a Dime.
 Kristan Cunningham: Cunningham studied interior design at the University of Charleston, eventually heading to Los Angeles to work in high-end furniture showrooms. She published the book Design on a Dime: Achieve High Style on a $1000 Budget in 2003 and Six Steps to Design on a Dime. Cunningham hosted the first 10 seasons of the show, beginning in 2003. She left HGTV in 2011 after filming more than 150 episodes.

Design team 

 Spencer Anderson: Anderson grew up in Houston, Texas, where he studied art and metal sculpture. He later moved to Los Angeles, where he began assistant art directing on small cable films.
 Ali Azhar: Azhar's philosophy of design is that lighting, color and texture make a room. As a contractor, he handles lighting, building, and tiling, among other things.
 Summer Baltzer: Baltzer began her career designing and decorating for community and equity theater productions in the Southern California area, while also running her own residential interior design business. She received her formal training at California State University-Northridge in the Family Environmental Sciences department, where she studied architectural and interior design.
 Charles Burbridge: Burbridge was born in Los Angeles, where he had a decorative painting and interiors business.
 Kelly Edwards: Edwards was born in Chicago. After working for three years in Los Angeles as the design assistant for one of the original Design on a Dime design teams, she returned to her hometown.
 Abraham Hopkins: Hopkins' approach is to bring green homes and eco-developments to the public. Hopkins is the owner of Paradigm Building, a construction company specializing in green building. Before, he worked for 10 years as a carpenter. He received a bachelor's degree in construction management from Cal Poly. He went on to earn his contractors license following that, and with five years' experience, he was certified as a Green Builder.
 David Sheinkopf: Sheinkopf grew up in New York City. After years of acting, he began building and designing, focusing on set design and art direction on music videos and commercials.

Seasons 
Design on a Dime started airing in 2003, producing a total of 31 seasons.

External links

References

HGTV original programming